Orhan Gülle (born 15 January 1992) is a Turkish professional footballer who plays as a midfielder for TFF Third League club Yomraspor. Gülle is also a youth international for Turkey, having been capped at various levels.

Early life and club career
Gülle was born in Düzköy, a town in Trabzon Province to a tradesman and a housewife. Along with his parents and three siblings – two brothers and one sister – Gülle moved to Istanbul at the age of one. Coming from a football-eccentric family, Gülle started playing the sport at an early age. He signed up for a football school at the age of 11, and later signed with local club Esenler in 2002. Although Gülle went on to become a professional, he didn't take football very seriously as a youngster, saying "I didn't have any goals then... becoming a footballer was a dream for me". Beşiktaş scouts spotted the talented midfielder at an Istanbul amateur football tournament, and signed him on 18 September 2006. Gülle spent four years with the Black Eagles, amassing 47 appearances and five goals in the A2 (under 20) league. He was called up to train with the senior squad during the 2009–10 season, but did not make his professional debut with the club.

Gaziantepspor (2010–2014)
Gaziantepspor confirmed on 2 July 2010 that they had transferred the young midfielder, signing him to a four-year contract. He made his professional debut on 14 August 2010 against Kasımpaşa, entering the fray in the 70th minute. Gülle also made an appearance in the second match of the season, coming in with a half-hour left in the match.

International career
Gülle has been capped at U-15, U-16, U-17, U-18, U-19, U-20, and U-21 levels for Turkey. He represented his country at the 2009 UEFA European Under-17 Championship, 2009 FIFA U-17 World Cup and 2011 UEFA European Under-19 Championship. He was an unused sub in Turkey's 17 November 2010 match against the Netherlands.

References

External links
 
 
 

1992 births
People from Düzköy
Living people
Turkish footballers
Turkey youth international footballers
Turkey under-21 international footballers
Association football midfielders
Beşiktaş J.K. footballers
Gaziantepspor footballers
Kayseri Erciyesspor footballers
Sivasspor footballers
Boluspor footballers
MKE Ankaragücü footballers
Fethiyespor footballers
Ankara Demirspor footballers
Süper Lig players
TFF First League players
TFF Second League players
TFF Third League players